Tobias Kamke was the defending champion but was defeated by Evgeny Donskoy in the semifinals.
Donskoy won the title by defeating Jan-Lennard Struff 6–2, 4–6, 6–1 in the final.

Seeds

Draw

Finals

Top half

Bottom half

References
 Main Draw
 Qualifying Draw

Aegon Pro-Series Loughborough - Singles
2012 Men's Singles